Jan Smuts Ground (formerly known as Recreation Ground and The Oval) is a cricket ground in East London, Eastern Cape, South Africa. The first recorded match on the ground was in 1906, when the East London cricket team hosted the touring Marylebone Cricket Club (MCC). Border used the ground as their principal home ground from the 1906–07 season until 1987–88.

References

External links

Cricket grounds in South Africa
Sports venues in the Eastern Cape
Sports venues completed in 1905
1905 establishments in the Cape Colony
East London, Eastern Cape